Moushumi Akhter Salma (known as Salma Akhter) is a Bangladeshi folk singer. She rose to fame in 2006 after winning the second season of "Closeup 1 Tomakei Khujchhey Bangladesh", a television series broadcast on NTV.

Early life 
She was born in the village of Gangarampur, Daulatpur Upazila, Kushtia District, Khulna Division.

Music career 
Salma started learning singing from her Guruji Baul Shafi Mandal at the age of four . She got the lesson of classical music along with folk from her Guruji. Her turning point started at the age of twelve when she attended the musical Reality show "Closeup One" (season 2) organized by NTV in 2006. She became the champion among 1 Lac contestants.

Her first single Baniya Bondhu struck the market along with another song Chailam Jarey while she was in the competition. At the same time, her song got popularity named Amar Ek Noyon.

Salma is specially considered for singing Lalon geeti along with all other Bengali folk songs. She also performs semi –classical & modern Bengali songs.

Salma got educated in music from her another teacher Ustad Sanjib Dey since 2011 to till now.

Salma released 11 solo albums from various audio Labels. She also worked on more than 30 mixed albums. Her 1st Solo Album is Baniya Bondhu.

Salma has performed worldwide.

Personal life
In 2010, Salma married Shibli Sadique, a businessman and the incumbent member of parliament from Dinajpur-6 constituency. Salma gave birth to her first daughter, Sneha (b. 2012). The couple got divorced in November 2016. Salma then married Sanaullah Nur Sagar, a British migrant, on 31 December 2018. She gave birth to her second daughter, Safia Nur, in September 2019.

Awards 
 Bachsas - Best Female Singer

Discography

References 

Living people
People from Kushtia District
Year of birth missing (living people)
Place of birth missing (living people)
21st-century Bangladeshi women singers
21st-century Bangladeshi singers
Bangladeshi folk singers
People from Khulna